Fort Lupin, also known as Fort de la Charente, is an artillery battery in Saint-Nazaire-sur-Charente, in the department of Charente-Maritime, France. It was built in the 1680s to a design by Sébastien Le Prestre de Vauban, and it is now in good condition.

History
Fort Lupin was built on the southern bank of the Charente, and commanded the approach to Rochefort and its arsenal along with Fort Lapointe on the opposite bank of the river.

The first proposal to build a fortification in the area was made in 1672 by the engineer La Favolliere, and it was eventually built between 1683 and 1686. The fort's initial design was made by François Ferry, but the plans were extensively modified by Sébastien Le Prestre de Vauban, who reduced its size due to a lack of funds.

The fort consists of a semi-circular gun battery ringed by a parapet with twenty-two embrasures. A tour-réduit and two blockhouses are located at the gorge. The fort is further protected by a ditch, a covertway and a glacis.

Fort Lupin was never attacked, and it never fired its guns in anger. It was decommissioned in the late 19th century, and was subsequently abandoned and vandalized.

The fort was classified as a monument historique on 26 June 1950, and was sold to a private owner in 1964. The owners have restored the fort, and today it is in good condition. It is not open to the public on a regular basis.

Gallery

References

Vauban fortifications in France
Buildings and structures in Charente-Maritime
Monuments historiques of Nouvelle-Aquitaine
Buildings and structures completed in 1686
Military installations closed in the 19th century
Artillery batteries
1686 establishments in France